Lieutenant Arthur William Hammond was an English World War I flying ace credited with five aerial victories as an observer/gunner.

Early life
Hammond was born on 29 August 1890 in Walton on the Hill, Lancashire, England. He was the son of Henry and Alice (née Kincaid) Hammond, his father was a Master Mariner.

Military life
Hammond joined the Royal Horse Guards as a trooper. In October 1915, he was commissioned as a Temporary Second Lieutenant in the Royal Engineers before transferring to the Royal Flying Corps (RFC) as an observer. Flying with 2 Squadron RFC he was credited with five victories as an observer/gunner flying the Armstrong Whitworth F.K.8 biplane. The pilot mentioned in his second Military Cross citation was Alan Arnett McLeod, who was awarded the Victoria Cross for the same action. Hammond lost a leg due to his wounds and left the RFC.

Later life
At the end of the war, he emigrated to Canada at the invitation of the family of Alan McLeod. He landed in Stonewall, Manitoba and worked as a road engineer for a year. He then moved to Winnipeg and began a long career with the Great West Life Company.  In the Second World War, he served as an adjutant in the Royal Canadian Air Force.

Arthur Hammond was married twice – first to Nellie Grant of Winnipeg in 1927 and later in life as a widower to longtime friend Dorothy Wardrop (née Williams) in 1956. On retirement in 1946 he moved to Victoria, BC.  He died in Victoria, British Columbia, on 22 December 1959, aged 69.

Honours and awards
22 April 1918 – T/Lt Arthur William Hammond, RE, attached to the Royal Flying Corps is awarded the Military Cross:

26 July 1918 – T/Lt Arthur William Hammond, MC, RE and RFC is awarded a bar to the Military Cross:

List of aerial victories
See also Aerial victory standards of World War I

References

1890 births
1959 deaths
Royal Air Force officers
Royal Flying Corps officers
Royal Horse Guards soldiers
Royal Engineers officers
English aviators
People from Burton upon Trent